K18DD-D is a low-power television station serving Camp Verde, Arizona and the entire Verde Valley. Owned by Central States Communications of Camp Verde, the station broadcasts locally produced programming, as well as programming from the Three Angels Broadcasting Network (3ABN), and overnight programming from ShopNBC. The station's signal covers most of Verde Valley from its transmitter located on Mingus Mountain near Jerome, Arizona.

History
An original construction permit was granted to Central States Communications on November 30, 1989, to build a low-power television station K18DD on channel 18 to serve Camp Verde. The station was licensed on July 30, 1992, as a low-power station and was upgraded to Class A status in 2002. The station surrendered its class A license and reverted to a standard low-power license on December 18, 2014, and was then licensed for digital operation on February 3, 2015.

External links
 TV-18 website
 3ABN website
 ShopNBC website
 

Three Angels Broadcasting Network
18DD-D
Television channels and stations established in 1989
Low-power television stations in the United States